Husnah Kukundakwe (born 25 March 2007) is a Ugandan swimmer who is currently the country's only classified paralympic swimmer. Her first appearance at the World Championships in London was mentioned among the International Paralympic Committee’s (IPC’s) Top 10 Moments of 2019.

Background and education 
Kukundakwe was born in 2007 in Rubaga Hospital to Hashima Batamuriza and Ahmed Asiimwe. She has a congenital limb impairment that left her with no right lower arm. She attended Lyna Daycare and Nursery School and as of 2019, she was residing in Kampala and was a pupil at Apollo Kaggwa Primary School in Mengo, a Kampala suburb.

Participation in swimming 
Kukundakwe begun swimming at the age of five and is a member of Gators Swim Club Kampala. Locally she participated in  the 2017 DSTV swimming gala challenge in 2017 at Greenhill Academy, Kampala. Kukundakwe participated in the 2018 Korea Paralympic Youth Camp where she won gold in the 100m breaststroke.

As of May 2019, Kukundakwe was competing in the S9 (freestyle, butterfly and backstroke), SB8 (breaststroke) and SM9 (Individual Medley) which were reviewed at the World Para Swimming World Series 2019 in Singapore. She recorded three personal best times in the 100m breaststroke (1:57.8), 100m freestyle (1:30.43) and 50m freestyle (40.24).

From this event, she qualified and was Uganda's sole representative at the London 2019 World Para Swimming Allianz Championships. At this event she bettered her times in the 50m (38.14) and 100m (1:24.85) freestyle events.
2021 she represented Uganda at 2020 Paralympic Games in Tokyo Japan and recorded her personal best (PB) in 100m Breaststroke 

2022 she represented Uganda at Lignano Sabbiadoro World Series and earned Uganda its first International Para Swimming medals in 100m Butterfly and 100m Breaststroke 

She also represented Uganda at the Commonwealth Games in Birmingham from 28th July to 8th August 2022 as its sole Para Swimmer 

Still, in 2022 she participated at the Konya 2021 Islamic Solidarity Games in Turkey and raised Uganda's flag higher by winning 6 medals. 2 Gold, 3 silver and Bronze in Para Swimming events

See also 
 2019 World Para Swimming Championships
 Prossy Tusabe
 Tofiri Kibuuka

External links 
 World Para Swimming
 Dolphins Swim Club Kampala 
 Uganda Paralympic Committee
 Husna Kukundakwe on the Olympic Channel

References 

2007 births
Sportspeople from Kampala
Living people
Paralympic swimmers of Uganda
Ugandan female swimmers
Swimmers at the 2022 Commonwealth Games
Commonwealth Games competitors for Uganda
21st-century Ugandan women